The fourth season of the American television medical drama Grey's Anatomy, commenced airing in the United States on September 27, 2007 and concluded on May 22, 2008. The season continues the story of a group of surgeons and their mentors in the fictional Seattle Grace Hospital, describing their professional lives and the way they affect the personal background of each character. Season 4 had 12 series regulars with 10 of them returning from the previous season, out of which 8 are part of the original cast from the first season. The season aired in the Thursday night timeslot at 9:00 EST. In addition to the regular 17 episodes, a clip-show narrated by the editors of People recapped previous events of the show and made the transition from Grey's Anatomy to Private Practice, a spin-off focusing on Dr. Addison Montgomery and aired on September 19, 2007, before the season premiere. The season was officially released on DVD as a 5-disc box-set under the title of Grey's Anatomy: Season Four – Expanded on September 9, 2008 by Buena Vista Home Entertainment.

For the first time in the show's history, many cast changes occur, seeing the first departure of 2 main cast members. Despite garnering several awards and nominations for the cast members and the production team, the season received a mixed response from critics and fans. Show creator Shonda Rhimes heavily contributed to the production of the season, writing 5 out of the 17 episodes. The highest-rated episode was the season premiere, which was watched by 20.93 million viewers. The season was interrupted by the 2007–2008 Writers Guild of America strike, which resulted in the production of only 17 episodes, instead of 23 originally planned.

Episodes 

Each episode of this season is named after a song.

Cast and characters

Main 
 Ellen Pompeo as Dr. Meredith Grey
 Sandra Oh as Dr. Cristina Yang
 Katherine Heigl as Dr. Izzie Stevens
 Justin Chambers as Dr. Alex Karev
 T.R. Knight as Dr. George O'Malley
 Chandra Wilson as Dr. Miranda Bailey
 James Pickens, Jr. as Dr.Richard Webber
 Sara Ramirez as Dr. Callie Torres
 Eric Dane as Dr. Mark Sloan
 Chyler Leigh as Dr. Lexie Grey
 Brooke Smith as Dr. Erica Hahn
 Patrick Dempsey as Dr. Derek Shepherd

Recurring 
 Lauren Stamile as Nurse Rose
 Sarah Utterback as Nurse Olivia Harper
 Diahann Carroll as Jane Burke
 Jack Axelrod as Charlie "Really Old Guy" Yost
 Edward Herrmann as Norman Shales
 Kali Rocha as Sydney Heron
 Elizabeth Reaser as Rebecca "Ava" Pope
 Loretta Devine as Adele Webber
 Anjul Nigam as Dr. Raj Sen
 Jeff Perry as Thatcher Grey
 Debra Monk as Louise O'Malley
 Mark Saul as Dr. Steve Mostow
 Amy Madigan as Dr. Katharine Wyatt
 Cress Williams as Tucker Jones

Notable guests

Production 
This is the first season to be produced by ABC Studios under its current name, after the transition from Touchstone Television in May 2007. It was also produced by ShondaLand Production Company, and The Mark Gordon Company, whereas Buena Vista International, Inc. distributed it. The executive producers were creator and showrunner Shonda Rhimes, Betsy Beers, Mark Gordon, Krista Vernoff, Rob Corn, Mark Wilding, Joan Rater, and James D. Parriott, all part of the production team since the series' inception. The regular directors were Rob Corn and Jessica Yu. Producer Shonda Rhimes wrote 5 of the 17 episodes, 2 of which were along with fellow producer Krista Vernoff. Unlike the other seasons, except from the first one, which aired mid-season, the fourth season of Grey's Anatomy had a reduced number of episodes, due to the 2007–2008 Writers Guild of America strike, which caused the production to cease from February to April, leaving the show with no writing staff during that time. Since the show had only produced 10 episodes before the winter-holiday hiatus, and aired another one after the break ended, the show decided to complete the season with 6 new episodes, and returned on April 24, 2008. Only 17 episodes were produced out of the 23 originally conceived for the season.

After Kate Walsh's transition the Grey's Anatomy spin-off, Private Practice, her character left the show after a 2-year run. On June 7, 2007, it was announced that Isaiah Washington's contract had not been renewed. Former Reunion star, Chyler Leigh, guest starred in the final 2 episodes of season 3 as Lexie Grey, a new intern and Meredith Grey's younger half-sister. On June 11, 2007, it was announced that Leigh would become a series-regular, instead of a 13-episode story-arc as previously planned. The character Dr. Erica Hahn, portrayed by Brooke Smith joined the main cast, reprising her antagonizing role in the season's fifth episode. She replaces Preston Burke as Head of Cardiothoracic Surgery. Upon her return, she makes Sandra Oh's character, Cristina Yang work harder for her success in Cardiothoracics and initially served as a new love-interest for Mark Sloan, played by Eric Dane. Even though a new male character was originally thought to be introduced as a rival for Dr. Derek Shepherd, the change didn't occur. Former Dawson's Creek star Joshua Jackson was scheduled to make his return to television in a multi-episode arc as a doctor with his first appearance in the season's eleventh episode. Jackson's appearance was cancelled due to the 2007–2008 Writers Guild of America strike, and the storyline of the character he was supposed to play never aired on the show.

Casting 

The fourth season had 12 roles receiving star-billing, with 10 of them returning from the previous season, 8 of whom are part of the original cast from the first one. All the actors who are billed as series-regulars portray physicians from the surgical wing of the fictional Seattle Grace Hospital. The majority of the show's episodes are narrated by Ellen Pompeo, who portrayed protagonist Dr. Meredith Grey, a surgical resident whose storylines are the series' focal-points. Sandra Oh acted as Meredith's best-friend, highly competitive resident Dr. Cristina Yang. Fellow resident Dr. Isobel "Izzie" Stevens was portrayed by Katherine Heigl, while Dr. Alexander "Alex" Karev was played by Justin Chambers. T. R. Knight acted as insecure resident with self-confidence issues, Dr. George O'Malley, whereas Chandra Wilson portrayed Chief Resident and general surgeon Dr. Miranda Bailey, former mentor of the 5 residents during their internship. James Pickens, Jr. portrayed attending physician and general surgeon Dr. Richard Webber, who continues his position as Chief of Surgery, despite his former wishes of retirement. Orthopedic surgeon and fifth-year resident Dr. Calliope "Callie" Torres, who was portrayed by Sara Ramirez, has to face her husband's unfaithfulness and her unexpected bisexuality. Attending plastic surgeon, Dr. Mark Sloan was portrayed by Eric Dane, who is constantly seeking reconciliation with former best-friend, attending physician and Chief of Neurosurgery Dr. Derek Shepherd (Patrick Dempsey), whose lasting relationship with Meredith Grey faces difficulties. Former Reunion star Chyler Leigh was promoted to series-regular status, after short appearances in the final 2 episodes of the third season, portraying Meredith's half-sister Lexie Grey, who opts for a surgical internship at Seattle Grace Hospital against Massachusetts General Hospital, after her mother's sudden death. Silence of the Lambs star, Brooke Smith was upgraded to series-regular status after multiple guest appearances in the second and third seasons. An antagonizing character at first, she replaces Preston Burke as the Chief of Cardiothoracic Surgery, constantly displaying disrespect for Cristina's previous relationship with him.

Numerous supporting characters have been given recurring appearances in the progressive storyline, including former Gilmore Girls actor Edward Herrmann who appeared in 3 episodes. Seth Green of Buffy the Vampire Slayer guest starred in 2 episodes, whereas Lauren Stamile portrayed nurse Rose, a love-interest for Derek. Former regular Kate Walsh appeared for the first time since her departure on May 1, 2008 receiving a special guest-star billing in the role of Addison Montgomery, now the main character of the spin-off Private Practice. Jeff Perry, Loretta Devine and Debra Monk reprised their roles as Thatcher Grey, Adele Webber and Louise O'Malley, respectively. Diahann Carroll and Elizabeth Reaser continued their season 3-introduced roles as Jane Burke and Rebecca Pope, respectively.

In October 2006, news reports surfaced that Washington had insulted co-star T. R. Knight with a homophobic slur during an argument with Patrick Dempsey. Shortly after the details of the argument became public, Knight publicly disclosed that he was gay. The situation seemed somewhat resolved when Washington issued a statement, apologizing for his "unfortunate use of words during the recent incident on-set." The controversy later resurfaced when the cast appeared at the Golden Globes in January 2007. While being interviewed on the red carpet prior to the awards, Washington joked, "I love gay. I wanted to be gay. Please let me be gay." After the show won Best Drama Series, Washington, in response to press queries as to any conflicts backstage, said, "I never called T. R. a faggot." However, in an interview with Ellen DeGeneres on The Ellen DeGeneres Show, Knight said that "everybody heard him."

After being rebuked by his studio, Touchstone Television, Washington issued a statement apologizing for repeating the word on the Golden Globes carpet. On January 30, 2007, a source told People magazine that Washington was scheduled to return to the Grey's Anatomy set as early on that Thursday for the first time since entering "executive counseling" after making the comments at the Golden Globes. However, on June 7, 2007, ABC announced it had decided not to renew Washington's contract, and that he would be dropped from the show. "I'm mad as hell and I'm not going to take it anymore," Washington said in a statement released by his publicist, borrowing the famous line from Network. In another report, Washington stated he was planning to "spend the summer pursuing charity work in Sierra Leone, work on an independent film and avoid worrying about the show." In a subsequent interview, Washington claimed that "they fired the wrong guy", referring to Knight, and said he was considering filing a lawsuit as a result. He accused Knight of using the controversy to bolster his own career and increase his salary on Grey's Anatomy. Washington, in late June 2007, began asserting that racism within the media was a factor in his firing from the series. On July 2, 2007, Washington appeared on Larry King Live on CNN, to present his side of the controversy. According to Washington, he never used the "F Word" in reference to Knight, but rather blurted it out in an unrelated context in the course of an argument "provoked" by Dempsey, who, he felt, was treating him like a "B-word," a "P-word," and the "F-word," which Washington said conveyed "somebody who is being weak and afraid to fight back." Washington himself said that his dismissal from Grey's Anatomy was an unfortunate misunderstanding that he was eager to move past. He later stated that if he were to be asked to make a cameo appearance on the show, he would not hesitate to say "yes." Washington's image was used in advertisements for the May 9, 2008 episode "The Becoming." After this aired, Washington's attorney Peter Nelson contacted ABC and Screen Actors Guild and cited this as an unlawful use of his client's image. His publicist, Howard Bragman, told The Hollywood Reporter that "they have the rights of the character to advance the story, but not the image" and stated he expected this to result in a "financial settlement", but it is still uncertain whether this ultimately happened.

Reception

Ratings 
The season was the second to air in the Thursday night time-slot, at 9:00 ET, after it was moved at the beginning of the third season, following 2 seasons in the Sunday night timeslot, as a lead-out to Desperate Housewives, which aired at 9:00 ET for its entire run. The season aired as a lead-out to Ugly Betty, then in its second season, which aired on Thursday nights at 8:00 ET. Grey's Anatomy averaged 15.92 million viewers in its fourth season, ranking #10 in viewership. The highest-rated episode of the season was the season premiere, with 20.93 million viewers tuning in and a 7.3 rating, ranking #3 for the week. The episode showed a decrease in ratings compared to the previous season premiere, which had almost 5 more million viewers tuning in and a 9.0 rating. The season premiere also attracted less viewers than the previous season finale, which was watched by 22.57 million viewers, and received an 8.0 rating Although "A Change is Gonna Come" attracted more viewers than Desperate Housewives "Now You Know", which was watched by 19.32 million viewers, received a 6.7 rating and ranked #4 in the week, the episode was outperformed by CSI: Crime Scene Investigation "Dead Doll", which aired in the same hour and ranked first in the week, with 25.22 million viewers tuning in and an 8.8 rating. The lowest-rated episode was the ninth, watched by 14.11 million viewers and ranked #14 in the week, with a 4.9 rating, seeing a sudden decrease, after the previous episode, the second most-watched in the season, which attracted 19.61 million viewers and received a 6.8 rating. "Crash Into Me: Part 1" was outperformed in the time slot by CSI: Crime Scene Investigation "You Kill Me", the Thanksgiving special episode which attracted 14.75 million viewers and received a 5.2 rating, ranking #11 in the week. The season finale was watched by 18.09 million viewers, being the first-season finale of Grey's Anatomy to attract less than 20 million viewers. It was ranked #5 in the week, and received a 6.3 rating. There was a significant decrease in the number of viewers, compared to the previous season finale, which attracted almost 4 more million viewers and received an 8.0 rating.

The following table shows each episode's live + same-day DVR 18–49 key demographic rating, the live + same-day DVR viewership, and the live + 7-day DVR viewership.

Critical response 
Debbie Chang of BuddyTV.com expressed disappointment in the shows' development throughout the season, by stating it was "all about couples, jumping in-and-out of relationships, trying their darndest to have hot sex on the cramped, twin-sized bunk-beds in the on-call room." Chang also noted the little screen-time of characters Richard Webber and Mark Sloan, and the lack of romantic development in their storylines. Many critics negatively reviewed Izzie Stevens's development in the show's fourth season, particularly her affair with George. Katherine Heigl herself deemed their relationship "a ratings-ploy." Heigl explained: "They really hurt somebody, and they didn’t seem to be taking a lot of responsibility for it. I have a really hard time with that kind of thing. I’m maybe a little too black-and-white about it. I don’t really know Izzie very well right now. She’s changed a lot!" Laura Burrows of IGN stated the series became "a little more than mediocre, but less than fantastic" in its fourth season. She also said that "this season proved that even strong chemistry and good acting cannot save a show that suffers from the inevitable recycled plot." However, the episode "Physical Attraction, Chemical Reaction" received a positive review, with Burrows stating that it "fully encompassed all the things that make this show great: intense emotional drama and macabre OR activities." The Derek/Rose relationship received negative reviews, with Burrows stating that it was "emotional, but not remarkable." Jack Florey of IndieLondon reviewed the characters, stating that their behaviour is the show's biggest problem: "the self-absorbed, pretentious and frequently-selfish attitudes that drive the surgeons at the centre of Grey’s exasperate more than reward." As for the storylines, Foley stated that they didn't "ring true" and that "the plot devices became increasingly clunky", noting the lack of realism in arcs such as George and Callie's marriage and the Izzie's affair "as a means of ripping it apart." Florrey also commented on Meredith Grey's arc, by stating that she turned into "one of the most selfish, self-centered characters on television", whereas Mark Sloan's storyline was named "sex-obsessed, borderline-misogynistic and close to scandalous." Daniel Fienberg of Zap2It said "One of the season's best performances came from Emmy-nominated guest star Elizabeth Reaser." Pajiba TV reviewed Reaser's performance by stating that it "has been one of the only good things that show's had going for it anymore." Entertainment Weekly called Reaser's performance as Ava the sixth most-memorable patient performance on the show. About.com stated that Alex Karev developed into "a bold and overly-confident surgeon."

Accolades 

Several actors and members of the production team have been awarded for their work on the show during the season. At the 60th Primetime Emmy Awards on September 21, 2008, Sandra Oh was nominated for her performance as Cristina Yang in the episode "The Becoming", whereas Chandra Wilson received a nomination for her portrayal of Miranda Bailey in "Lay Your Hands on Me", both for the Outstanding Supporting Actress in a Drama Series. Katherine Heigl who portrayed Izzie Stevens declined to put her name forward for consideration at the Emmy Awards, claiming that she had been given insufficient material on the series to warrant a nomination. Diahann Carroll was nominated for Outstanding Guest Actress in a Drama Series for her portrayal of Jane Burke in "Love/Addiction." The make-up team, consisting of Norman T. Leavitt, Brigitte Bugayong, Thomas R. Burman and Bari Dreiband-Burman, was nominated for both Best Prosthetic Make-Up in "Forever Young" and Best Non-Prosthetic Make-Up in "Crash Into Me." Sara Ramirez's portrayal of Callie Torres was positively reviewed, resulting in her receiving a nomination at the 2008 American Latino Media Arts Awards. At the 65th Golden Globe Awards on January 13, 2008, the series was nominated for Best Drama Television Series, whereas Katherine Heigl's individual performance resulted in a nomination for Best Supporting Actress in a Television Series. At the 40th National Association for the Advancement of Colored People Image Awards, Chandra Wilson won Outstanding Actress in a Drama Series, where Shonda Rhimes was awarded at the Outstanding Writing in a Dramatic Series category, for "Freedom." James Pickens, Jr. also received a nomination for his performance as Richard Webber at the Outstanding Supporting Actor in a Drama Series category. At the 2008 Prism Awards, Justin Chambers was nominated for Performance in a Drama Series Episode, whereas Elizabeth Reaser received a nomination for Performance in a Drama Multi-Episode Storyline. At the Teen Choice Awards in 2008, Patrick Dempsey and Katherine Heigl were nominated for Choice Television Actor and Actress.

DVD release 
The fourth season was officially released on DVD in region 1 on September 9, 2008, almost 3 weeks before the fifth season premiere, which aired on September 25, 2008. Under the title Grey's Anatomy: Season Four – Expanded, the box-set consists of episodes with Dolby Digital 5.1 surround sound and widescreen format. It also contained extras available only on DVD, including extended episodes, interviews with cast and crew members, footage from behind-the-scenes and unaired scenes cut from the aired episodes. The same set was released in region 4 on November 5, 2009, after more than a year after its original release in the United States, whereas its first release date in region 2 was November 23, 2009. The DVD box set is currently #1074 in Movies and Television on Amazon.com and #1927 in Film and Television on Amazon.co.uk. The season was also released as a 5-disc Blu-ray box set in regions A and B.

References 

 
 
 
 

 

2007 American television seasons
2008 American television seasons
Grey's Anatomy seasons